Rotary Blood Bank is India's largest blood bank, located in the Tughlakabad Institutional Area, New Delhi, India.

Background
Rotary Blood Bank was established in 2002 and is under the supervision of the Central Government. In September 2021, Rotary revealed its plan to extend its services to other parts of the country. It has blood banks in cities including Kakinada, Hyderabad, and Visakhapatnam.
The blood bank signed an MoU with Shri Vishwakarma Skill University for providing certificate programme in phlebotomy technician and OJT in medical lab technology programmes.

Blood collection center
At the 56-57 Tughlakabad Institutional Area facility are available collection stations for 5-50 people giving blood donations at a time.

Camp
Rotary collects blood from organized groups e.g. Colleges and Organizations, where any person can donate blood. Blood collections are collected by two Mini Buses which provide a mobile medical facility.

Processing of blood
After collection of blood from in-house/camp, it is processed in the lab; where an erst while state-of-art facility is available after initial screening. Here blood separated in major three components e.g. Red cells, Plasma and Platelets. In last few years there is a large demand for Platelets from September to December to treat Dengue fever.

System/equipments
 MCS+ Hemonitics for Platelet Apheresis
 Mitis 2 automated blood grouping system
 Cryofuge 6000 refrigerated centrifuge
 Ortho AutoVue Ultra for blood grouping and cross matching
 VITROS 3600 used for testing infectious marker
 Platelet agitator

See also
 Blood donation in India

References

 Blood banks in India
Medical and health organisations based in India
Health in Delhi
Blood donation
2002 establishments in Delhi